Citizen Kate is a mockumentary series about a fictional citizen journalist named Kate on the actual presidential campaign trail that has been produced in 2008 and in 2016. 

Without any experience in either politics or reporting, Citizen Kate attends political events, where she talks with senators, delegates, and presidential candidates in order to uncover the political process. Citizen Kate has been described as a "half valley girl, half Michael Moore".

References

External links 
Citizen Kate 2008 Trailer
Citizen Kate 2016 Iowa intro episode

American political blogs